The GNU toolchain is a broad collection of programming tools produced by the GNU Project. These tools form a toolchain (a suite of tools used in a serial manner) used for developing software applications and operating systems.

The GNU toolchain plays a vital role in development of Linux, some BSD systems, and software for embedded systems. Parts of the GNU toolchain are also directly used with or ported to other platforms such as Solaris, macOS, Microsoft Windows (via Cygwin and MinGW/MSYS), Sony PlayStation Portable (used by PSP modding scene) and Sony PlayStation 3.

Components
Projects included in the GNU toolchain are:
 GNU make: an automation tool for compilation and build
 GNU Compiler Collection (GCC): a suite of compilers for several programming languages
 GNU C Library (glibc): core C library including headers, libraries, and dynamic loader
 GNU Binutils: a suite of tools including linker, assembler and other tools
 GNU Bison: a parser generator, often used with the Flex lexical analyser
 GNU m4: an m4 macro processor
 GNU Debugger (GDB): a code debugging tool
 GNU Autotools (GNU Build System): Autoconf, Automake and Libtool

See also

 GNU Classpath
 GNU Core Utilities
 CVS and Git
 MinGW and Cygwin
 Cross compiler
 LLVM

References

External links
 GCC, the GNU Compiler Collection
 Building and Installing under Linux
 Prebuilt Win32 GNU Toolchains for various embedded platforms

Programming tools
toolchain